In the folklore of the Alpine region of south-central Europe, the Tatzelwurm or Stollenwurm, Stollwurm is a lizard-like creature, often described as having the face of a cat, with a serpent-like body which may be slender or stubby, with four short legs or two forelegs.

The alleged creature is sometimes said to be venomous, or to attack with poisonous breath, and to make a high-pitched or hissing sound.

Anecdotes describing encounters with the creature or briefly described lore about them can be found in several areas of Europe, including the Austrian, Bavarian, French, Italian and Swiss Alps. It has several other regional names, including Bergstutz, Springwurm, Praatzelwurm, and in French, .

Nomenclature
The name Tatzelwurm is not traditionally used in Switzerland, and the creature is usually known by the Swiss as Stollenwurm or Stollwurm ("tunnel worm" or "dragon of the mine-tunnels") in the Bernese Alps. Stollenwurm may also be interpreted to mean a "serpent" with "short, thick feet".

Tatzelwurm was the term localized in Bavaria, Germany (with variants Daazlwurm and Praazlwurm) according to an early study. But Tatzelwurm has later came into currency in Austria.

Bergstutz, Birgstutz or Birgstuz'n ("mountain-stump") was the local name used in places in Austria such as the state of Styria, parts of the Tyrol, Salzburg and the Salzkammergut region, and some parts of Bavaria (specifically Berchtesgaden), according to early studies. The name was simply Stutzn in the valleys of the Traun and Alm rivers of Austria.

In the French Alps, "" was the applied name of the legendary cat-headed lizard.

Description

In the anecdotes, Tatzelwurm or Stollenwurm has been described as resembling a stubby lizard with 2 to 6 feet, measuring from around 1 to 7 feet in length. They have been described as having a cat-like face, especially in Switzerland.

The Tatzelwurm of Austria and Bavaria is described as having poison breath, said even to be lethal. The Stollenwurm also has been characterized as poisonous in Swiss lore.

The Tatzelwurm also allegedly issues a shrieking sound, whistles or hisses.

17th century accounts

Even though Wagner had been the one to record the testimonies, the creatures were later dubbed "Scheuchzer's dragons", and were interpreted as Stollenwurm sightings by other commentators.

The anecdotes
An anecdotal "cat-headed serpent" with a black-grey body and no legs  was said to have been encountered by Johann[es] (Hans) and Thomas Tinner at a place locally known as "Hauwelen" on the mountain of Frümsen in the Barony of Altsax, Switzerland. It was alleged to measure 7 feet or more in length. Residents in the neighborhood were complaining that their cows' udders were being mysteriously sucked on but the incidents stopped after this creature was killed.

A four-legged, cat-faced "mountain dragon" was described by one Andreas Roduner as something he encountered in 1660 on Mt. Wangersberg in Sarganserland (Landvogtei of Sargans), and when it reared up on its hind legs it became tall as a man, with boar-like bristles running down its back (pictured right).

It was a creature like a four-legged lizard with a crest on its head, to give a later naturalist's description, was allegedly seen by Johannes Bueler of Sennwald Parish. A dragon with an enormous head and two forelimbs, was claimed to have been encountered by 70-year-old Johannes Egerter of Lienz on Mt. Kamor; when it exhaled its breath, the man said, he was overcome with headache and dizziness.

Later analysis and reception
The naturalist Karl Wilhelm von Dalla Torre writing on the "history of dragons of the Alps" in 1887 explained that these creatures could all be identified as species of lizards or snakes (seemingly ignoring the cat-headed features). Dalla Torre considered these giant creatures of the past to have died out by his time, alongside the folk belief associated with them, but that the popular notion of the Tatzelwurm in his day lingered on as a "phantom" of those past legendary creatures.

In contrast,  counted these early dragons among his "Tatzelwurm of old and now", the title of his 1896 paper. Although Wagner in the 17th century reported each Swiss monster sighted as a dragon, Studer in the early 19th century stated that the Alpine Swiss locals were generally unfamiliar with the names Drache or Lindwurm and knew only of Stollenwurm.

Scheuchzer was frequently ridiculed for his credulity in the dragons, evident in the tone of his work, but one scholar has discovered that in an earlier piece of writing, he had actually expressed skepticism in the material. The scholar comments that Newtonian scholars like him in this era had to maintain a posture of open-mindedness.

Early 18th and 19th century accounts
A 1779 legend describes an encounter with the Tatzelwurm by farmer Hans Fuchs. According to the story, while in the mountains, he allegedly saw two of these creatures in front of him. Frightened for his life, he fled to his home and died of a heart attack from the experience. Supposedly before he died, he told his family of the encounter, describing the creature as 5 to 7 feet in length with a serpent-like body, two clawed front legs and a large feline-like head.

Two Bernese, Samuel Studer (1757–1834) and Johann Rudolf Wyss, (1783–1830) who contributed greatly to Swiss folklore in the early part of the 19th century also added to the knowledge of folklore of the Stollenwurm. Although both authors give expression to the idea that the Stollenwurm (rather than Swiss dragons) have heads that look like cats, this is not to say that actual examples of lore they collected from Alpine people speak of any cat-headed creatures.

Samuel Studer
The Stollenwurm according to Studer is so called from Stollen meaning "short feet", and were believed to appear after humidly hot weather or when the weather is undergoing volatile change. The people considered them to be poisonous and harmful, and to resemble short, stubby serpents, with a round head similar to a cat's, and clawed feet.

Studer represents perhaps the best source of knowledge on the Stollenwurm available. His contribution to the lore occurred in a short article on insects and the Stollenwurm which appeared inserted in the travelogue of the Franz Niklaus König's travelogue, published in 1814.

Studer's treatise included eyewitness accounts. In 1811, a Stollenwurm with a forked tongue, serpent-like but rather wide head, and two stubby feet was reported by a Schoolmaster Heinrich, which he claimed to have seen in Guttannen-tal, Canton Bern, Switzerland. He described it as measuring 1 klafter in length, with a body about the thickness of a man's leg. A few years before, Hans Kehrli from Allmentli in Trachselwald claimed to have killed a quite small, hairy Stollenwurm carrying 10 young.

Studer offered a bounty of 3 to 4 Louis d'or to anyone who could supply him with the remains of an "authentic stollenwurm", indicating the degree of his conviction that the creature existed.

Johann Rudolf Wyss
The writer Johann Rudolf Wyss, explicitly stated that while the dragon was fabulous, the Stollenwurm was dubious. To the standard description of the Stollenwurm as a sort of snake with a cat's head and short feet, he added it was sometimes said to be hairy, and not just 2 or 4 but multiple limbs like a caterpillar.

Wyss records a fabulous description from a certain shepherd in Gadmen valley who said there were two types of Stollenwurm, white ones with a little crown, and the more common black ones.

Something Wyss had done in his commentary is to bring up several pieces of Swiss folklore on snakes, suggesting connections. He conjectured that herdsmen of the Alps were "probably" talking about the Stollenwurm when they said they believed "serpents" had the habit of sucking milk from pasturing cows, which could be warded against by placing a white rooster near the cows.

See also

 Lindworm
 Chinese dragon
 Olm

Explanatory notes

References

Bibliography

 

 
 (French tr.)

Further reading

 
 

European dragons
Alpine folklore
Bavarian folklore
Austrian folklore
Swiss folklore
Italian folklore
German legendary creatures
Italian legendary creatures
Milk in culture
Cat folklore

fr:Lindworm#Tatzelworm